Teatro da Pontifícia Universidade Católica de São Paulo is a theatre in São Paulo, Brazil.

References

Theatres in São Paulo
Pontifical Catholic University of São Paulo